Kodikurichi is a village in Tenkasi district in Tamil Nadu, India. It is on National Highway 744, and in the foothills of the Western Ghats, near Coutrallam Falls. It is 7 kilometers from the Tenkasi district headquarters.

Etymology
The Name Kodikurichi was named after The Ruler Named Kodi.

History
The Ruler Kodi Ruled Kodikurichi, and Sivaramapettai was called pettai because this used to be a market place and they named Sivaramapettai because It is named after a Temple named Shri Shivaramanangai amman Temple.

Location
It is Located in Kadayanallur Taluka of Tenkasi district, Tamil Nadu and has an Agriculture Land, which is large.

Temples
1.Shri Shivaramanangai Amman Temple
2.Shri Shivalingeshwara Temple

Educational Institutions
1.Sri Ram Nallamani Yadava College
2.USP Polytechnic College
3.Karayalar College

Villages in Tenkasi district